Testacella maugei is a species of air-breathing, carnivorous land slug, a terrestrial gastropod mollusc in the family Testacellidae, the shelled slugs.

Description
The back and sides of this slug are brownish and darker, with some brown and yellowish spots. Near the foot the body is yellowish, with a greenish or orange hue. The shape of the body is somewhat conical when crawling (the anterior part being wider than the posterior part, and the posterior part is truncated). The points of origin of the lateral grooves are about 5 mm apart at the mantle; they are not joined. The sole is yellowish.
The shell rudiment is located on the posterior section of the dorsum. It is almost parallel-sided and large, with its apex pointing downwards, and the basal end of the aperture pointing upwards. The shell is greenish or brownish with two whorls and a keeled suture.
Animal 6–12 cm, shell 13-17 x 7-11 x 3.5-3.5 (height) mm.

Distribution
Morocco (Atlantic coast) Azores, Madeira, Canary Islands, Portugal, Spain, Channel Islands, France (Atlantic coast) and the British Isles (Britain and Ireland)

References

 Spencer, H.G., Marshall, B.A. & Willan, R.C. (2009). Checklist of New Zealand living Mollusca. pp 196–219 in Gordon, D.P. (ed.) New Zealand inventory of biodiversity. Volume one. Kingdom Animalia: Radiata, Lophotrochozoa, Deuterostomia. Canterbury University Press, Christchurch.

External links 
AnimalBaseTestacella maugei Distribution, biology, image
 Testacella maugei   images at Encyclopedia of Life

Testacellidae
Gastropods described in 1819